Richard E. W. Halliwell (born 1937) is a British veterinary surgeon. He has been President of the Royal College of Veterinary Surgeons, the American College of Veterinary Dermatology and European College of Veterinary Dermatology. He twice served as Dean of the Dick Vet School in Edinburgh.

Education and career

Halliwell studied veterinary science at Cambridge University graduating in 1961, and subsequently receiving his doctorate there in 1973.

He taught at both the University of Pennsylvania and the University of Florida. He served as Dean of Veterinary Science at Edinburgh University (at the Dick Vet School) for two periods, from 1990 to 1994 and for the academic year 2001–02.

In 1989 he was President of the world's first conference on Veterinary Immunology in Dijon in France. From 1994 to 1998, he was president of the European Association of Establishments for Veterinary Education (EAEVE).

In 2012 he was awarded the Hugo Schindelka medal by the World Association for Veterinary Dermatology (WAVD) in Vancouver, in recognition of a lifetime of excellent work in the field of veterinary dermatology. That same year, the World Small Animal Veterinary Association awarded him their international award for scientific achievement for advancing knowledge regarding disorders of companion animals.

Recognition

Halliwell was one of twenty "shadow portraits" created in the Summerhall building of the college, depicting former Principals. The portraits are now in the Easter Bush buildings.

Works

References

Alumni of the University of Cambridge
Academics of the University of Edinburgh
British veterinarians
1937 births
Living people